This is a list of wings in the United States Air Force, focusing on AFCON wings.  Air Force active duty and civilian personnel strength now must be at 1,000 or more for wings.

AFCON versus MAJCOM Wings

This page currently focuses on one of the two historical categories of USAF wings: "AFCON" (Headquarters (US) Air Force CONtrolled) units or "permanent" units, which during the Cold War period were readily distinguished by having one, two or three digit designations, such as the 1st Fighter Wing, 60th Military Airlift Wing, 355th Fighter Wing, and could go through a series of inactivations and activations and still retain their lineage.

There were also MAJCOM (major air command controlled) wings, such as the Strategic Wings of the 50s and 60s, which, under the USAF organization and lineage system, are four-digit units, for example, the 4137th Strategic Wing, and whose lineage (histories, awards, and battle honors) ended with their discontinuance and could never be revived.
MAJCOM wings are fundamentally "temporary", though many stayed in existence for a very long time, and then were revived with a different name but the same number. But under the USAF lineage system they cannot carry on the histories of the previous unit.

When the B-52 dispersal began in the fifties, the new Strategic Air Command units created to support this program were MAJCOM wings and given four-digit designations. Headquarters SAC was well aware of the historical significance of records and accomplishments of the strategic wings and the need to perpetuate this lineage as well as the lineage of many illustrious units that were no longer active.

In order to retain the lineage of the combat units and to perpetuate the lineage of many currently inactive units with illustrious World War II records, Headquarters SAC received authority from Headquarters USAF to discontinue its strategic wings that were equipped with combat aircraft and to activated AFCON units, most of which were inactive at the time.

The reorganization process, which took place from January to September 1963, was applied to 22 B-52 strategic wings, three air-refueling wings, and the 4321st Strategic Wing at Offutt Air Force Base, Nebraska. "These units were discontinued and two and three-digit AFCON units were activated. In most cases, the bombardment squadron that had been assigned to the strategic wings were inactivated and bombardment squadrons that had previously been assigned to the newly-activated wings were activated. While these actions were almost tantamount to redesignation, they were not official redesignation. Therefore, the records, awards and achievements of the strategic wing could not be inherited by the bomb wings."

During the Gulf War of 1990–91 MAJCOM wings, such as the 7440th Composite Wing (Provisional) at Incirlik AB, Turkey, served alongside Provisional Wings such as the 801st Bomb Wing (Provisional) at Morón Air Base, Spain, and other AFCON wings.

In the 1990s MAJCOM wings were mostly inactivated and replaced with AFCON wings. Perhaps the most well known example was the 4404th Wing in Saudi Arabia which was replaced by a three-digit AFCON wing, the 363rd Air Expeditionary Wing. It is not clear whether any MAJCOM wings still exist, or whether the system is still in use.

Active USAF Wings

Active Air National Guard Wings

 List of Active Wings of the United States Air National Guard

Air Expeditionary Wings
 List of Air Expeditionary units of the United States Air Force

AFCON and MAJCOM wings 

List of Air Force-controlled wings of the United States Air Force
List of MAJCOM wings of the United States Air Force

References

Wings